The Silver Scream 2: Welcome to Horrorwood (also known as Welcome to Horrorwood: The Silver Scream 2 or either simply Welcome to Horrorwood or The Silver Scream 2) is the sixth studio album by the American heavy metal band Ice Nine Kills, released on October 15, 2021, via Fearless. It is the band's first album to feature drummer Patrick Galante, bassist Joseph Occhiuti and guitarists Dan Sugarman and Ricky Armellino.

It is a follow-up and sequel to the band's previous album, The Silver Scream, which was inspired by horror films. The album is also inspired by horror films and features guest vocalists such as Jacoby Shaddix, George "Corpsegrinder" Fisher, Brandon Saller, Ryan Kirby and Buddy Nielsen. The album became the band's biggest commercial success, reaching number 18 on the US Billboard 200 and number one on the Hard Rock Albums chart.

Background
On October 5, 2018, the band released their fifth studio album The Silver Scream. Each song on the album was inspired by a horror movie. When teasing the single "Hip to Be Scared", inspired by American Psycho, the title of Ice Nine Kills' new album was listed in the credits as The Silver Scream 2: Welcome to Horrorwood. In an interview with Alternative Press, lead vocalist Spencer Charnas stated:

As with the previous album, each of the videos are based on the films that the tracks were written about, while also having an overall story arc across the sequence of videos.

Release
On the ninth of each month leading up to the album's release, a new single and accompanying video was released to promote the album. On July 9, 2021, the band released the lead single from the album, "Hip to Be Scared". The single features Papa Roach frontman Jacoby Shaddix and was released along with an accompanying music video. On August 3, 2021, the band released a teaser video featuring the album's track listing, leading fans to predict and speculate the horror/thriller movies that inspired the songs on the album. On August 9, 2021, the band released the second single, "Assault & Batteries", inspired by Child's Play. On September 9, 2021, the band released the third single, "Rainy Day", inspired by Resident Evil. On October 9, 2021, the band released the fourth single, "Funeral Derangements", inspired by Pet Sematary. The album was released on October 15, 2021. Four months after the album had released, the band released the fifth single from the record, "Take Your Pick" featuring George "Corpsegrinder" Fisher, taking cinematic inspiration from My Bloody Valentine and being released on February 14, 2022 to commemorate Valentine's Day alongside an animated music video. On May 16, 2022, the band released a live video for "The Shower Scene", that the band recorded on "The Trinity of Terror Tour", which the band finished in April along with Black Veil Brides and Motionless in White. This indicated that the song was the next to be released as a single, where the sixth single from the album was officially released on July 29 with a new acoustic rendition. An official video for "The Shower Scene", taking inspiration from Alfred Hitchcock's Psycho was released on August 9, 2022. The video features appearances from actors Scout Taylor-Compton, Joe Bob Briggs, and Ricky Dean Logan. The video also features horror YouTube creators, James A. Janisse and Chelsea Rebecca of Dead Meat. The music video narrative across the six released singles feature famous horror actor Bill Moseley as police chief Captain Harris.

Composition 
The Silver Scream 2: Welcome to Horrorwood has been described as metalcore, deathcore, post-hardcore, emo pop, horror punk, and hard rock. Blabbermouth.net described the album as "decadent, devious, and fiercely insane, with sardonic wit to spare."

Regarding specific tracks on the album, some stray from the genres used to describe the majority of the album. In "F.L.Y.", the band is said to "bring metalcore and symphonic metal together in unholy unison, just like Seth Brundle merging with the fly in the teleport." "Wurst Vacation" is a technical death metal song with electronica and Neue Deutsche Härte influences. "Ex-Mørtis" features rockabilly and swing influences, resulting in a psychobilly style.

"A Rash Decision" combines metalcore riffs with electronica elements and horns, "Rainy Day" is an industrial metal song, and "Take Your Pick" is a death metal and hardcore punk song. "Welcome to Horrorwood" is a symphonic death metal and pop punk song.

Reception

Critical reception

The Silver Scream 2: Welcome to Horrorwood received critical acclaim. Graham Ray of Distorted Sound called the album "heavier, catchier and more cohesive than [the original] The Silver Scream." Hysteria Magazine described the album as "dramatic, thrilling and fast-paced." In a positive review, Jake Richardson of Kerrang! stated "[The Silver Scream 2: Welcome to Horrorwood is] a unique, thrilling and unpredictable record, The Silver Scream 2 has all the makings of an instant horror hit."  

To sum up her thoughts on the album, Ali Cooper of Metal Hammer stated "Perfectly capturing the vast soundscapes, emotions and fake blood flowing through each movie stamped with their own metalcore trademark, Ice Nine Kills have crafted a flawless effort so deeply invested in its subject matter that it demands replay after replay… if you dare." Comparing the album to its predecessor, Ashley Gallagher of New Noise Magazine stated The Silver Scream felt like a collection of tracks while Welcome to Horrorwood was a complete body of work, keeping the listener wanting more after each and every song." Simon Crampton of Rock Sins considered the album to be "a huge step up from their previous work."

Melinda Welsh of Spill Magazine considered the album to be the "hard core exception to the general rule that “sequels suck”." Dan Harrison of Upset Magazine called the album "a pulpy delight." Comparing the album to movie sequels, Carys Hurcom of Wall of Sound stated "...to reference the film class scene in "Scream 2", it’s not "The Godfather Part II" (universally acknowledged as a superior film to the original), but more of a Terminator 2...in that both are great for different reasons, and will entirely depend on whether you like more understated, subtle texts or more fast, “action-packed” and in your face texts. Whatever your preference, The Silver Scream 2: Welcome To Horrorwood is still a hell of an experience.

Accolades

Commercial performance
The Silver Scream 2: Welcome to Horrorwood debuted within the Top 20 on the Billboard 200 at number 18, selling 25,000 copies in its first week with 18,000 of which were pure sales. It also was the fifth best selling album and the second best-selling rock album of the week in the United States, only behind Coldplay's  Music of the Spheres, as well as topping the US Digital Albums chart. It is the band's biggest commercially successful album on the Billboard charts to date.

In the United Kingdom, The Silver Scream 2: Welcome to Horrorwood was the band's second album to chart on the UK Rock & Metal Albums Chart following The Silver Scream, debuting at number 15. It was also the twelfth most downloaded album of the week in the country. When the album was released on physical formats in Europe, it resurfaced on the UK Rock & Metal Albums Chart and peaked at number 11 just missing out on the Top 10. While falling to chart on the UK Albums Chart, it did however debut and peak on the UK Albums Sales Chart and Scottish Albums Chart at number 54 and 70 respectively.  It peaked on the UK Physical Albums Chart at number 51. The Silver Scream 2: Welcome to Horrorwood spent a total of three non-consectutive weeks on the UK Rock & Metal Albums Chart.

Track listing
All lyrics written by Spencer Charnas and Steve Sopchak, all music written by Ice Nine Kills, except when noted.

Personnel
Credits retrieved from album's liner notes.

Ice Nine Kills
 Spencer Charnas – lead vocals
 Ricky Armellino – rhythm guitar, backing vocals
 Joseph Occhiuti – bass, backing vocals, keyboards
 Dan Sugarman – lead guitar, backing vocals
 Patrick Galante – drums, percussion

Additional musicians
 Jacoby Shaddix of Papa Roach – guest vocals (track 8)
 George "Corpsegrinder" Fisher of Cannibal Corpse – guest vocals (track 9)
 Brandon Saller of Atreyu – guest vocals (track 10)
 Ryan Kirby of Fit for a King – guest vocals (track 10)
 Buddy Nielsen of Senses Fail – guest vocals (track 11)
 Drew Fulk – additional vocals (track 12)
 Sarah J. Bartholomew – additional vocals (tracks 2-5, 8-14)
 Nadia Teichmann – additional vocals (track 8)
 Carson Beck – voiceovers (tracks 1, 5)
 Domingo Castillo – voiceovers (track 4)
 Kelly Cordes – voiceovers (track 4)
 Robert Lindsay – voiceovers (track 12)

Production
 Drew Fulk – producer, mixing, mastering, additional programming
 Ice Nine Kills – composition
 Spencer Charnas – lyrics
 Ricky Armellino – additional engineering
 Joseph Occhiuti – additional engineering, additional programming
 Jeff Dunne – mixing
 Francesco Ferrini – orchestration, programming

Charts

Weekly charts

Year-end charts

Release history

References

External links
The Silver Scream 2: Welcome to Horrorwood at YouTube (streamed copy where licensed)

2021 albums
Fearless Records albums
Ice Nine Kills albums
Sequel albums
Metalcore albums
Symphonic metal albums
Deathcore albums
Post-hardcore albums
Hard rock albums
Emo pop albums